Ruwan Galappathy (born 30 January 1978) is a Sri Lankan former cricketer. He played in 60 first-class and 42 List A matches between 1998/99 and 2006/07. He made his Twenty20 debut on 17 August 2004, for Galle Cricket Club in the 2004 SLC Twenty20 Tournament.

References

External links
 

1978 births
Living people
Sri Lankan cricketers
Galle Cricket Club cricketers
Sinhalese Sports Club cricketers
Place of birth missing (living people)